Christopher John Anstey (born 1 January 1975) is an Australian former professional basketball player. His career included stints in the National Basketball Association (NBA), Russia and Spain. Anstey was selected by the Portland Trail Blazers in the first round (18th pick overall) of the 1997 NBA draft. He also played for the Melbourne Tigers, South East Melbourne Magic and Victoria Titans in the NBL. He retired at the end of the 2009–10 season while with the Tigers and later became the team's head coach in 2012.

Professional career

Early NBL years
Anstey took up basketball at the relatively late age of 17. Before that he was a promising tennis player, peaking at rank number 2 amongst Australia's 15-year-old players and regularly playing doubles with Mark Philippoussis. In 1994, he joined the Melbourne Tigers and was teammates with some of the most recognisable names in Australian basketball, such as Andrew Gaze, Mark Bradtke, and Lanard Copeland, as well as head coach Lindsay Gaze. After one season with the Tigers, Anstey was signed by South East Melbourne Magic coach Brian Goorjian. He played for the Magic from 1995 to 1997, earning NBL's Most Improved Player award in 1996 as well as the 1996 NBL Championship, before going to the NBA.

NBA
Anstey was the 18th overall selection of the 1997 NBA Draft by the Portland Trail Blazers. His draft rights were traded by the Blazers with cash to the Dallas Mavericks for the draft rights to Kelvin Cato in June 1997.  His rookie year, 1997–98, he averaged 5.9 PPG and 3.8 RPG in 16.6 MPG.  He scored a career-high 26 points against the Boston Celtics on 17 March. The next year, his numbers dropped to 3.3 PPG and 2.4 RPG.  He was traded by the Mavericks to the Chicago Bulls for a second-round draft pick in 2000 in September 1999.  He averaged 6.0 PPG and 3.8 RPG on 44.2 FG% in his last NBA season with the Bulls.  Anstey owns career NBA averages of 5.2 PPG, 3.4 RPG and 0.4 BPG in 155 games with 23 starts.

Europe and return to NBL
Anstey returned to the NBL with the Victoria Titans in 2000–01, winning Best Sixth Man. In 2003, Anstey led Russian club Ural Great Perm to runners up in the Russian Championship, and was named ULEB Cup MVP. In 2004, Anstey signed with UNICS Kazan, and had an All-Star season, leading the team to a EuroChallenge Championship, the first in Russian history. Anstey was a Euroleague All-Star again in 2005. Anstey returned to his native Australia with his original team, the Melbourne Tigers, in 2006. After returning, Anstey enjoyed plenty of success, leading the NBL in blocks in 2006, 2007, 2008 and 2009; and in rebounding in 2008 and 2009; earning the MVP in 2006 and 2008; Grand Finals MVP in 2006 and Best Defensive Player in 2008.

Chris Anstey retired from playing at the conclusion of the 2009–10 NBL season. In his final NBL game against the Gold Coast Blaze at the State Netball and Hockey Centre in Melbourne, Anstey scored 13 points, had 6 rebounds, 2 assists and 1 block though the Blaze defeated the Tigers 91–73.

Olympics and World championships
Anstey was a member of the Australian boomers, competing in the 2000 Sydney Olympics and the 2008 Beijing Olympics, though unfortunately he missed the 2004 Athens Olympics due to injury. He was also a member of the Boomers at the 1998 FIBA World Championship in Athens.

Anstey won Gold with the Australian Emus at the 1997 22 & Under World Championships played in his home town of Melbourne where was named as tournament MVP.

Coaching
Anstey was appointed head coach of Caulfield Grammar School's first boys' team in 2010 and still holds that position today.  His team won 3 APS titles, 2 McDonald's Cups and  1National Championship.

Anstey coached the Camberwell Dragons senior Men at Big V level in 2011 and 2012, guiding them to consecutive semi-finals appearances, representing the most successful period of time in club history.

Anstey was appointed head coach of the Melbourne Tigers for the 2012–13 NBL season. He was subsequently re-signed as the head coach for 2013–14 for his efforts during 2012–13. On 13 October 2014, he stepped down as head of Melbourne following United's 2014–15 season opening loss to Cairns.

Career highlights
 1994 – Melbourne Tigers.
 NBL Semi-finals.
 1995 – 97 South East Melbourne Magic.
NBL Semi-finals (1995).
NBL Championship, Most Improved Player. (1996).
 NBL Championship runners up (1997).
 1997
 Australian National (22&U) team.
 Won world championships.
 Named tournament MVP.
Selected 18th in the NBA draft.
 1998
 Dallas Mavericks
 Represented Australia at the Goodwill Games.
 1999
 Traded to Chicago Bulls in the NBA's offseason.
 2000
 Boomers
 Won Hong Kong Diamond Ball Classic.
 4th in the Sydney Olympics.
 2001
 Victoria Titans
 2002
 NBL All Star Five
 Australian International Player of the Year
 2003
 Ural Great Perm
 Runner-up to Russian Championship.
 Russian Championship All Star Five.
 Russian Championship All Import Team.
 Russian Championship Best Centre.
 2004
 UNICS Kazan
 FIBA EuropeLeague Champions.
 FIBA EuropeLeague All Star.
 Russian Championship Runner-up.
 2005
 UNICS Kazan.
 FIBA EuropeLeague All Star
 2006
 Melbourne Tigers
 NBL Pre-season MVP
 NBL Regular Season MVP
 NBL Champions
 NBL Grand Final Series MVP
 2008
 Melbourne Tigers
 NBL Regular Season MVP
 NBL Champions
 NBL Grand Final Series MVP
 NBL Best Defensive Player
1st place NBL rankings for defensive and total rebounds, and blocks

On 13 September 2000, Anstey was awarded the Australian Sports Medal.

Corporate
In 2010, Anstey founded the TLC Group, which comprises TLC Mentoring, TLC Management and TLC Events. The TLC Group provides services and programs to students, athletes, corporate groups and general audiences. He resigned from the TLC Group in 2014.

Anstey participated in the 2012 and 2013 EJ Whitten Legends Game at Etihad Stadium, helping to raise funds and awareness for prostate cancer.

Appointed Company Ambassador to La Trobe Financial in 2015

Personal life
Anstey has three children, Isobel, Ethan and Hunter.
Isobel has been selected for the Australian women's under 17 and under 19 teams.

Career statistics

Player

NBA

|-
| style="text-align:left"| 1997–98
| style="text-align:left;"| Dallas
| 41 || 8 || 16.6 || .398 || .188 || .716 || 3.8 || 0.9 || 0.8 || 0.7 || 5.9
|-
| style="text-align:left"| 1998–99
| style="text-align:left;"| Dallas
| 41 || 4 || 11.5 || .360 || .000 || .708 || 2.4 || 0.7 || 0.4 || 0.3 || 3.3
|-
| style="text-align:left"| 1999–2000
| style="text-align:left;"| Chicago
| 73 || 11 || 13.8 || .442 || .167 || .789 || 3.8 || 0.9 || 0.4 || 0.3 || 6.0
|- class="sortbottom"
| style="text-align:center;" colspan="2" | Career
| 155 || 23 || 13.9 || .413 || .138 || .789 || 3.4 || 0.8 || 0.5 || 0.4 || 5.2
|}

NBL

|-
| style="text-align:left"| 1994
| style="text-align:left;"| Melbourne Tigers
| 20 || NA || 6.7 || .490 || .000 || .737 || 2.6 || 0.4 || 0.2 || 0.2 || 3.1
|-
| style="text-align:left"| 1995
| style="text-align:left;"| South East Melbourne Magic
| 26 || NA || 9.6 || .493 || .000 || .607 || 3.3 || 0.3 || 0.2 || 0.3 || 3.3
|-
| style="text-align:left; background:#afe6ba;"| 1996†
| style="text-align:left;"| South East Melbourne Magic
| 32 || NA || 21.9 || .607 || .000 || .730 || 7.8 || 0.6 || 1.2 || 1.5 || 11.8
|-
| style="text-align:left"| 1997
| style="text-align:left;"| South East Melbourne Magic
| 33 || 33 || 30.5 || .479 || .154 || .675 || 9.8 || 0.8 || 1.6 || 1.8 || 13.8
|-
| style="text-align:left"| 2000–01
| style="text-align:left;"| Victoria Titans
| 28 || 28 || 26.1 || .499 || .240 || .718 || 9.4 || 0.9 || 0.8 || 2.0 || 16.4
|-
| style="text-align:left"| 2001–02
| style="text-align:left;"| Victoria Titans
| 34 || 34 || 31.3 || .480 || .160 || .751 || 10.5 || 1.3 || 1.4 || 1.3 || 16.8
|-
| style="text-align:left; background:#afe6ba;"| 2005–06†
| style="text-align:left;"| Melbourne Tigers
| 37 || 37 || 39.2 || .455 || .359 || .741 || 10.0 || 3.8 || 1.1 || 2.1 || 22.5
|-
| style="text-align:left"| 2006–07
| style="text-align:left;"| Melbourne Tigers
| 38 || 38 || 34.8 || .438 || .229 || .808 || 9.3 || 2.8 || 1.2 || 1.8 || 19.4
|-
| style="text-align:left; background:#afe6ba;"| 2007–08†
| style="text-align:left;"| Melbourne Tigers
| 37 || 37 || 35.6 || .480 || .311 || .771 || 11.6 || 2.6 || 1.5 || 2.0 || 21.8
|-
| style="text-align:left"| 2008–09
| style="text-align:left;"| Melbourne Tigers
| 35 || 35 || 35.8 || .433 || .250 || .743 || 10.5 || 2.1 || 1.6 || 1.6 || 18.6
|-
| style="text-align:left"| 2009–10
| style="text-align:left;"| Melbourne Tigers
| 16 || NA || 23.5 || .352 || .268 || .761 || 9.8 || 1.9 || 0.8 || 0.7 || 9.8
|- class="sortbottom"
| style="text-align:center;" colspan="2" | Career
| 336 || NA || 28.4 || .468 || .303 || .744 || 8.8 || 1.7 || 1.1 || 1.5 || 15.5
|}

Coach

NBL

|- 
| align="left" |Melbourne Tigers
| align="left" |2012–13
|28||12||16|||| align="center" |5th ||—||—||—||—
| align="center" |Missed playoffs
|- 
| align="left" |Melbourne Tigers
| align="left" |2013–14
|28||15||13|||| align="center" |3rd ||3||1||2||
| align="center" |Semi-finalists
|- 
| align="left" |Melbourne United
| align="left" |2014–15
|1||0||1|||| align="center" | || || || || 
| align="center" |
|-class="sortbottom"
| align="left" |Career
| ||57||27||20|||| ||3||1||2||

References

External links
Eurobasket.com Profile

1975 births
Living people
Australian expatriate basketball people in Russia
Australian expatriate basketball people in Spain
Australian expatriate basketball people in the United States
Basketball players at the 2000 Summer Olympics
Basketball players at the 2008 Summer Olympics
Basketball players from Melbourne
Centers (basketball)
Chicago Bulls players
Dallas Mavericks players
Liga ACB players
Melbourne Tigers players
Melbourne United coaches
National Basketball League (Australia) coaches
National Basketball Association players from Australia
Australian men's basketball players
Olympic basketball players of Australia
PBC Ural Great players
Portland Trail Blazers draft picks
Real Betis Baloncesto players
Recipients of the Australian Sports Medal
South East Melbourne Magic players
Victoria Titans players
1998 FIBA World Championship players
Competitors at the 1998 Goodwill Games